Vydehi Institute of Medical Sciences and Research Centre (VIMS) is in Whitefield, Bangalore, India. It is an independent medical institute dedicated to education, research and patient care. VIMS was established in 2000 and is promoted by Srinivasa trust.

Healthcare 
Vydehi Hospital in Bangalore is one of India's largest super speciality hospitals with a capacity of 1520 beds, with advanced Hi-tech equipment and facilities like state-of-the-art MRI, spiral CT scan, cardiac echo machine, cardiac catheterization lab, ultrasound equipment, linear accelerator, etc. All diagnostic facilities are available through the central diagnostic lab and radiology departments. Other essential Front line super specialty departments such as Neuro, Ortho, Gastroenterology were available round the clock in the hospital.

In April 2016, the State of art Central Diagnostic Laboratory at Vydehi Institute of Medical Sciences & Research Centre was awarded the National Accreditation Board for Testing and Calibration Laboratories (NABL) accreditation.

Education 
Vydehi Institute of Medical Sciences and Research Centre has four academic institutions:
 Vydehi Institute of Medical Sciences
 Vydehi Institute of Dental Sciences
 Vydehi Institute of Nursing Sciences
 Vydehi Institute of Biotechnology Sciences

The campus also has two specialty centers: Vydehi Institute of Rehabilitation and Vydehi Ayurveda Gram.

The institute offers undergraduate and post-graduate degrees. The college annually accepts 250 students for the MBBS undergraduate course. Admission to this course is made through a merit list prepared on the basis of the scores of the candidates in neet exam. Post-graduate admission is 56 seats.

Vydehi Institute of Medical Sciences is recognized by Medical Council of India and affiliated to Rajiv Gandhi University of Health Sciences. VIMS is included in the directory of the World Health Organization, which is required to be recognized internationally for purposes of higher postgraduate education and employment opportunities. It has tie-ups with the University of Georgia and University of California.

The Vydehi Institute of Dental Sciences is recognized by Dental Council of India and is affiliated to Rajiv Gandhi University of Health Sciences. Admission to this course is made through a merit list prepared on the basis of candidate scores in the neet exam followed by Centralized Counseling. Number of seats allotted in BDS is 60 per year.

The Vydehi Institute of Nursing Sciences and Research Centre recognized by Indian Nursing Council and affiliated to Rajiv Gandhi University of Health Sciences. Total of 100 seats are allotted in B.Sc. Nursing.

Vydehi Institute of Biotechnology Science Affiliated to Bangalore University offers 40 in M.Sc. Biotechnology. And 60 in B.Sc. Biotechnology (Biochemistry, Genetics and Biotechnology)

There are paramedical courses offered by the institute and that are affiliated to Rajiv Gandhi University of Health Sciences. Number of seats are 20.

VIMS uses a unique, collaborative approach to medical research and training. The institute is involved in conducting research in medical subjects and is committed to advancement of medical education, healthcare and research and is set to achieve a greater level of excellence in all these fields. Biotech Institute and Biotech Park signed an international co-operative agreement with University of Georgia, Athens, USA for research-oriented work to update the knowledge database. Vydehi Institute further widens its academic horizon with the establishments of super-specialty departments.

The work flow of institute is managed through Medical Campus Management Solutions, which is a complete web-based application. The medical college management system eases out Admission Process, fee management, transport, attendance and several other applications.

References

External links 
 
 Vydehi Cancer Center
 Rajiv Gandhi University of Health Sciences
 UGA Fact book 2002

Medical colleges in Karnataka
Medical Council of India
Colleges in Bangalore
Colleges affiliated to Rajiv Gandhi University of Health Sciences
Educational institutions established in 2000
2000 establishments in Karnataka